Joseph Aníbal Carvallo Torres (born 1 May 1990), known as Aníbal Carvallo, is a Chilean footballer who last played for Ñublense in the Primera B de Chile.

International career
Along with Chile U18 he won the 2008 João Havelange Tournament, scoring in the last game. At senior level, he made an appearance for Chile in a friendly match against Paraguay on February 15, 2012.

Honours

Club
Universidad de Concepción
 Primera B (1): 2013 Transición
 Copa Chile (1): 2014–15

Ñublense
 Primera B (1): 2020

International
Chile U18
 João Havelange Tournament (1): 2008

References

External links
 
 

1990 births
Living people
People from Lota, Chile
Chilean footballers
Chile youth international footballers
Chile international footballers
Chilean Primera División players
Primera B de Chile players
Segunda División Profesional de Chile players
Colo-Colo footballers
Deportes Temuco footballers
Puerto Montt footballers
Rangers de Talca footballers
Deportes Iquique footballers
Universidad de Concepción footballers
Deportes Melipilla footballers
Deportes La Serena footballers
Ñublense footballers
Association football forwards